Northfield School may refer to:
 Northfield School & Sports College (Billingham, England)
 Arcadia Charter School (Northfield, Minnesota), previously known as Northfield School of Arts and Technology
 Northfield Mount Hermon School (Gil, Massachusetts)
 Northfield School (Kohima, Nagaland, India)
 Northfield School of the Liberal Arts (Wichita, Kansas)
 PAREF Northfield School (Quezon City, Philippines)

See also
 Northfield Academy (Aberdeen, Scotland)